Khrystyna Podrushna (born 12 August 1977) is a Ukrainian alpine skier. She competed in two events at the 1994 Winter Olympics.

References

1977 births
Living people
Ukrainian female alpine skiers
Olympic alpine skiers of Ukraine
Alpine skiers at the 1994 Winter Olympics
Sportspeople from Lviv
20th-century Ukrainian women